Jagodnja (Serbian Cyrillic: Јагодња) is a mountain in western Serbia, near the town of Krupanj. Its highest peak Košutnja Stopa has an elevation of 939 meters above sea level.

The peak of Mačkov kamen (923 m) was the site of one of bloodiest battles in World War I between Serbian and Austro-Hungarian army, during the Battle of Drina. There is a monument (Memorial ossuary Mačkov kamen) dedicated to the fallen Serbian soldiers.

References

External links
Etno-selo Mačkov kamen 

Mountains of Serbia